Social workers use education as a key tool in client and community interactions. These educational exchanges are not always explicit but are the foundation of how social workers learn from their service participants and how social workers can assist with information delivery and skill development.

Psychoeducation 

One of the well-known ways in which social workers engage service participants with valuable information is through psychoeducation.
Psychoeducation "reflects a paradigm shift to a more holistic and competence-based approach, stressing health, collaboration, coping, and empowerment". This method can be used within individual and community-wide interactions but consistently focuses on service participant's strengths. It is a model that allows the social worker to provide the service participant with information necessary to make an informed decision that will allow them to reach their respective goals.

Education as a tool in community empowerment 

Within the educational setting, social workers can provide valuable information through Parent Universities (PU). Boston Public School's (BPS) Focus on Children Program facilitates a PU for parents of children in the school district. PU focuses on child development, content children are learning in school, parent and child advocacy,
parental leadership and effective parenting skills. The goal of the program is to provide parents with information that is beneficial for their children's academic
success and their own personal and professional development. These classes are free to all parents with children in BPS and take place on select Saturdays throughout the year. A model such as this could be a great forum for social workers, including school social workers, to work with parents in regard to their child's academic needs.

Washtenaw Interfaith Coalition for Immigrant Rights (WICIR) is an organization co-founded by University of Michigan social work professor, Laura Sanders and numerous other community volunteers. WICIR has been instrumental in leading the immigrant rights campaign in Washtenaw County, Michigan. This organization developed a volunteer urgent response team in response to a brutal immigration raid in 2008. It provides advocacy for families affected by increased immigration enforcement, Know Your Rights education to the immigrant community, ally education, and leads political actions toward local policy changes that affect immigrants and immigration reform. Recently WICIR has provided training to empower immigrant community members to speak in public and to policy makers on behalf of policy reforms, advocate for the community and help other immigrant families. Educational materials and workshops are provided in both English and Spanish. WICIR's use of creative and empowering educational sessions, provide in both English and Spanish has allowed them to be inclusive and responsive the community's needs.

Alternatives 

The NASW Code of Ethics places emphasis on the importance of the Social Work profession being sensitive, aware and culturally competent (1.05) while building partnership with participants. The notion of cultural competency is being discussed; a new terminology suggests using cultural humility vs. cultural competency. These authors suggest that cultural humility
is more sustainable and incorporates a lifelong commitment to self-evaluation and growth. The importance of bringing this to attention right away is to highlight that language use is extremely important when interacting with participants. Checking one's use of language as professionals have powerful impacts on our relationships. Furthermore, one's use of language can either perpetuate
hierarchy or help to minimize it. If a social worker's goal is to empower participants, minimizing hierarchy is one way to develop more meaningful and equal relationships.

One way to limit hierarchy and cultural imperialism together is through community or people's education. This form of education differs from that of dominant education by including voices that are frequently left out. This is examined and explained in depth by the educator and philosopher Paulo Freire.
In his most influential book Pedagogy of the Oppressed, Freire pioneered the
critical pedagogy movement. Rather than using a traditional top-down approach while educating, Freire believed in a bottom-up approach. With this shift in power-dynamics, educators including social workers will be more likely to realize the strengths of the people they are working with, rather than assuming that as professionals, we hold all the answers. This is extremely important for Social Workers to be aware of, because this philosophy fosters empowerment. The role of Social Workers is not to simply provide services, but to help others develop positive self-esteem.

Another example of this was Howard Zinn's "A People's History of America". Zinn believed that the dominant narrative being taught in schools was excluding the voice and contributions of marginalized populations. While looking for ways to incorporate people's education, one tool that exists is the Zinn Education Project. On this website educators can find critical resources which focus on the voices of oppressed and marginalized groups. This website contains hundreds of resources free of charge. Using tools such as this are beneficial for both the Social Worker and the participant.

When facilitating or participating in education that challenges dominant narratives, it is important to be aware of one's own social identity. People's identities are extremely complex and intersect with various aspects of our ascribed status (one assigned to you) and our achieved status (one that is "earned"). Reflecting and analyzing one's own identity and status can help foster a deeper understanding and respect for those around them. Being critical is an absolute necessity when engaging in alternative narratives.

While facilitating or educating it is important to set the mood of the group.  This is usually done through having an icebreaker before beginning the educational activity. This helps individuals warm up and get to know each other before discussing difficult issues, such as ones that challenge the dominant narrative. Many resources exist for icebreakers, but new ones can also be developed based on an education plan and the group to work with. After the discussion it is important to have some sort of closure for the group. Discussing alternatives to a dominant narrative can be eye opening, empowering or uncomfortable for some. It is beneficial to discuss how individuals are feeling so that you can tailor future discussions to the needs of the group.

Skills and tools for social workers that educate 

Several organizations provide supplemental materials and guides for social work professionals that educate. Some of the most comprehensive resources are available from university social work departments and non-profit organizations. Some examples of this include the Council on Social Work Education and the State University of New York School of Social Work. The CSWE Gero-Ed Center lists a practice guide for social workers educating certain or audiences that includes class exercises, assignments, case studies, and history.

Council on Social Work Education 

The Council on Social Work Education (CSWE) is a non-profit association partnership of educational and professional institutions that works to ensure and enhance the quality of social work education and for a practice that promotes individual, family, and community well-being, and social and economic justice. The association provides various training for community education in a social work setting. For instance, the CSWE Gero-Ed Center lists a practice guide for social workers educating certain populations or audiences that includes class exercises, assignments, case studies, and competencies history.

The material provided explains the benefits of each activity style and what a group would gain from its implementation. Many of the class exercises resemble community education events and are intended to provide insight into what educational styles may be best for the social worker's topic of interest or population. A policy analysis at a community agency meeting may call for an educational activity that divides the attending into groups to advocate for the interests of other community members or agencies. This type of activity, as described by the CSWE, allows for free discussion of intergenerational, multicultural, political issues associated with that policy. This tool is among many others the CSWE provides for social workers that educate.

The State University of New York School of Social Work 

For social workers that are new to educating, the State University of New York School of Social Work provides a great resource that can help each educator find their own style of teaching. They explain that teaching is as much of an art and that social workers, as educators, need to understand themselves and their students. Some of the identified tools provided by the School of Social Work include finding one's own learning style, how to develop effective lesson plans, reflective teaching and professional development, resources by subject, and solution-focused teaching among others.

Reflective teaching is one promoted aspect that explains the responsibility of the social worker to create an environment for creative problem solving. It allows for room to consider more alternatives and develop a body of knowledge based on experiences. In the social work setting this attempt to community education can prove to be most effective as people's environments and populations are constantly changing. Reflecting and monitoring the educational process can help to stabilize more creative and innovative ways to educate individuals, families, and communities. As social and economic justice issues become more prominent and delicate, social workers need to consider these tools for the benefit of help seekers.

References 

Social care in the United States
Social work education